"Tu Tatuta Tuta Ta" is a 1993 electronic song recorded by Italian music group Pin-Occhio. It was the second single from its debut album Pinocchio Vai!! and was released in June 1993, following the success of its previous hit single, "Pin-Occhio".

The song used a slightly modified riff from the 1983 song "Living on Video" recorded by Canadian band Trans-X, which was itself sampled in 2006 by Pakito. The lyrics are only composed of the title which is repeated in the refrains by a male voice.

Chart performance
"Tu Tatuta Tuta Ta" achieved some success throughout Europe, including France, Switzerland and the Netherlands where it reached the top 20, but it was a hit in Belgium (Wallonia) where it topped the chart for three weeks and remained in the top ten for nine weeks. In Belgium (Flanders), it peaked at number four and charted for 14 weeks. On the European Hot 100 Singles, it started at number 39 on 17 July 1993, peaked at number 26 three weeks later, and fell off the chart after 16 weeks of presence. However, the song was not successful in Germany where it failed the chart. Several additional remixes were produced for a release in Italy.

Track listings
These are the formats and track listings of major single releases of "Tu Tatuta Tuta Ta":

 CD single / 7" single - France, Belgium, Netherlands
 12" maxi - Spain, Italy

 CD maxi - France

 CD maxi / 12" maxi - Germany, Italy

 12" maxi - Remixes - Italy

Credits
 Lyrics and music : Marco Biondi and Nicola Savino
 Recorded at Village Studio-Sound
 Engineer : Miki Chieregato
 Executive licensee : Power Dance Dept of Sarema International
 Management : AES France
 Producer : Nicola Savino
 Cover design : Ephemere
 Distribution : Musidisc (France) / Distrisound (Belgium)

Charts

References

1993 singles
1993 songs
Blow Up singles
Pin-Occhio songs
Ultratop 50 Singles (Wallonia) number-one singles